General elections were held in Liechtenstein in August and September 1902.

Electors 
Electors were selected through elections that were held between 25 and 28 August. Each municipality had two electors for every 100 inhabitants.

Results 
The election of Oberland's Landtag members and substitutes was held on 4 September in Vaduz. Of Oberland's 118 electors, 117 were present. Oberland elected seven Landtag members and three substitutes.

The election of Unterland's Landtag members and substitutes was held on 3 September in Mauren. All of Unterland's 74 electors were present. Unterland elected five Landtag members and two substitute.

Jakob Kaiser was appointed by Prince Johann II as a Landtag member on 21 September 1902.

References 

Liechtenstein
1902 in Liechtenstein
Elections in Liechtenstein
September 1902 events